The 1929 Pittsburgh Pirates season was the 48th season of the Pittsburgh Pirates franchise; the 43rd in the National League. The Pirates finished second in the league standings with a record of 88–65.

Regular season

Season standings

Record vs. opponents

Game log

|- bgcolor="ccffcc"
| 1 || April 16 || @ Cubs || 4–3 || Grimes (1–0) || Root || — || 46,000 || 1–0
|- bgcolor="ffbbbb"
| 2 || April 17 || @ Cubs || 2–13 || Malone || Kremer (0–1) || — || — || 1–1
|- bgcolor="ffbbbb"
| 3 || April 18 || @ Cubs || 1–11 || Blake || Petty (0–1) || — || 14,000 || 1–2
|- bgcolor="ccffcc"
| 4 || April 20 || @ Reds || 5–4 || Grimes (2–0) || Rixey || — || — || 2–2
|- bgcolor="ffbbbb"
| 5 || April 22 || @ Reds || 4–9 || Lucas || Hill (0–1) || — || — || 2–3
|- bgcolor="ccffcc"
| 6 || April 24 || Cubs || 5–4 (13) || Swetonic (1–0) || Horne || — || 32,000 || 3–3
|- bgcolor="ffbbbb"
| 7 || April 26 || Cubs || 6–9 || Bush || Kremer (0–2) || Cvengros || 8,000 || 3–4
|- bgcolor="ffbbbb"
| 8 || April 27 || Cubs || 7–8 || Malone || Swetonic (1–1) || Blake || 25,000 || 3–5
|- bgcolor="ccffcc"
| 9 || April 28 || @ Cardinals || 6–2 || Petty (1–1) || Alexander || — || — || 4–5
|- bgcolor="ffbbbb"
| 10 || April 29 || @ Cardinals || 3–7 || Mitchell || French (0–1) || — || 12,000 || 4–6
|-

|- bgcolor="ffffff"
| 11 || May 1 || @ Cardinals || 4–4 (13) ||  ||  || — || — || 4–6
|- bgcolor="ffbbbb"
| 12 || May 4 || @ Braves || 3–5 || Seibold || Petty (1–2) || — || — || 4–7
|- bgcolor="ccffcc"
| 13 || May 5 || @ Braves || 7–2 || Grimes (3–0) || Smith || — || 28,000 || 5–7
|- bgcolor="ccffcc"
| 14 || May 6 || @ Braves || 4–3 || Swetonic (2–1) || Jones || — || — || 6–7
|- bgcolor="ccffcc"
| 15 || May 7 || @ Giants || 3–2 (10) || French (1–1) || Benton || — || — || 7–7
|- bgcolor="ffbbbb"
| 16 || May 8 || @ Giants || 0–11 || Hubbell || Petty (1–3) || — || 8,000 || 7–8
|- bgcolor="ccffcc"
| 17 || May 9 || @ Giants || 4–3 || Grimes (4–0) || Fitzsimmons || — || 7,500 || 8–8
|- bgcolor="ccffcc"
| 18 || May 10 || @ Phillies || 13–9 || Brame (1–0) || Willoughby || French (1) || — || 9–8
|- bgcolor="ffbbbb"
| 19 || May 11 || @ Phillies || 6–11 || Roy || Hill (0–2) || — || — || 9–9
|- bgcolor="ccffcc"
| 20 || May 13 || @ Robins || 12–4 || French (2–1) || Elliott || — || — || 10–9
|- bgcolor="ccffcc"
| 21 || May 15 || @ Robins || 9–4 || Grimes (5–0) || Clark || — || — || 11–9
|- bgcolor="ffbbbb"
| 22 || May 16 || Cardinals || 9–10 (10) || Johnson || Swetonic (2–2) || — || — || 11–10
|- bgcolor="ccffcc"
| 23 || May 17 || Cardinals || 6–2 || French (3–1) || Alexander || — || — || 12–10
|- bgcolor="ccffcc"
| 24 || May 18 || Cardinals || 6–3 || Kremer (1–2) || Sherdel || — || — || 13–10
|- bgcolor="ccffcc"
| 25 || May 19 || @ Cubs || 4–1 || Grimes (6–0) || Malone || — || 38,000 || 14–10
|- bgcolor="ffbbbb"
| 26 || May 20 || @ Cubs || 1–6 || Bush || Swetonic (2–3) || — || — || 14–11
|- bgcolor="ffbbbb"
| 27 || May 21 || @ Cubs || 6–8 || Horne || French (3–2) || Root || — || 14–12
|- bgcolor="ccffcc"
| 28 || May 22 || Reds || 11–2 || Kremer (2–2) || Ash || — || — || 15–12
|- bgcolor="ccffcc"
| 29 || May 23 || Reds || 6–3 || Grimes (7–0) || Rixey || — || — || 16–12
|- bgcolor="ccffcc"
| 30 || May 25 || Reds || 6–4 || Brame (2–0) || Luque || — || — || 17–12
|- bgcolor="ccffcc"
| 31 || May 26 || @ Cardinals || 12–8 || Fussell (1–0) || Haines || Grimes (1) || 30,000 || 18–12
|- bgcolor="ccffcc"
| 32 || May 26 || @ Cardinals || 7–5 || Kremer (3–2) || Frankhouse || Grimes (2) || 30,000 || 19–12
|- bgcolor="ccffcc"
| 33 || May 27 || @ Cardinals || 10–1 || Petty (2–3) || Hallahan || — || — || 20–12
|- bgcolor="ccffcc"
| 34 || May 28 || @ Cardinals || 5–2 || Brame (3–0) || Mitchell || — || — || 21–12
|- bgcolor="ccffcc"
| 35 || May 29 || Cubs || 7–2 || Swetonic (3–3) || Malone || Hill (1) || 5,500 || 22–12
|- bgcolor="ffbbbb"
| 36 || May 30 || Cubs || 1–5 || Nehf || Kremer (3–3) || Bush || 25,000 || 22–13
|- bgcolor="ccffcc"
| 37 || May 30 || Cubs || 4–0 || Grimes (8–0) || Root || — || 30,000 || 23–13
|- bgcolor="ffbbbb"
| 38 || May 31 || Phillies || 7–10 || Willoughby || Dawson (0–1) || McGraw || 3,500 || 23–14
|-

|- bgcolor="ffbbbb"
| 39 || June 1 || Phillies || 4–9 || Benge || Petty (2–4) || — || — || 23–15
|- bgcolor="ccffcc"
| 40 || June 3 || Phillies || 14–2 || Grimes (9–0) || Sweetland || — || — || 24–15
|- bgcolor="ccffcc"
| 41 || June 4 || Phillies || 9–5 || Swetonic (4–3) || Collins || — || — || 25–15
|- bgcolor="ccffcc"
| 42 || June 6 || Braves || 4–2 || Kremer (4–3) || Seibold || — || — || 26–15
|- bgcolor="ccffcc"
| 43 || June 7 || Braves || 6–2 || Brame (4–0) || Brandt || — || — || 27–15
|- bgcolor="ccffcc"
| 44 || June 8 || Robins || 9–2 || Grimes (10–0) || Clark || — || — || 28–15
|- bgcolor="ffbbbb"
| 45 || June 9 || @ Robins || 6–9 || Dudley || Petty (2–5) || — || 20,000 || 28–16
|- bgcolor="ffbbbb"
| 46 || June 10 || Robins || 6–7 || Moore || Swetonic (4–4) || Morrison || 3,500 || 28–17
|- bgcolor="ccffcc"
| 47 || June 11 || Robins || 3–2 || Brame (5–0) || Dudley || — || — || 29–17
|- bgcolor="ccffcc"
| 48 || June 12 || Giants || 7–6 || Meine (1–0) || Scott || — || 15,000 || 30–17
|- bgcolor="ccffcc"
| 49 || June 13 || Giants || 11–7 || Hill (1–2) || Genewich || Swetonic (1) || — || 31–17
|- bgcolor="ffbbbb"
| 50 || June 14 || Giants || 2–7 || Benton || Petty (2–6) || — || 10,000 || 31–18
|- bgcolor="ffbbbb"
| 51 || June 15 || Giants || 15–20 (14) || Mays || Swetonic (4–5) || — || 22,000 || 31–19
|- bgcolor="ccffcc"
| 52 || June 16 || @ Reds || 8–3 || Meine (2–0) || Luque || — || — || 32–19
|- bgcolor="ffbbbb"
| 53 || June 16 || @ Reds || 1–8 || Donohue || Grimes (10–1) || — || — || 32–20
|- bgcolor="ccffcc"
| 54 || June 17 || @ Reds || 2–1 || Kremer (5–3) || May || — || — || 33–20
|- bgcolor="ffbbbb"
| 55 || June 18 || @ Reds || 1–2 || Lucas || Brame (5–1) || — || — || 33–21
|- bgcolor="ccffcc"
| 56 || June 19 || @ Reds || 6–5 || Hill (2–2) || Rixey || — || — || 34–21
|- bgcolor="ccffcc"
| 57 || June 21 || @ Cubs || 14–3 || Grimes (11–1) || Cvengros || — || 35,000 || 35–21
|- bgcolor="ccffcc"
| 58 || June 22 || @ Cubs || 7–4 || Kremer (6–3) || Blake || — || 25,000 || 36–21
|- bgcolor="ccffcc"
| 59 || June 23 || @ Cubs || 8–7 || Swetonic (5–5) || Nehf || — || — || 37–21
|- bgcolor="ffbbbb"
| 60 || June 24 || @ Cubs || 3–4 || Root || Brame (5–2) || — || 7,000 || 37–22
|- bgcolor="ffbbbb"
| 61 || June 26 || Reds || 4–6 || Luque || Kremer (6–4) || — || — || 37–23
|- bgcolor="ccffcc"
| 62 || June 27 || Reds || 5–3 || Meine (3–0) || May || — || — || 38–23
|- bgcolor="ffbbbb"
| 63 || June 28 || Reds || 3–10 || Lucas || Brame (5–3) || — || — || 38–24
|- bgcolor="ccffcc"
| 64 || June 29 || Reds || 3–0 || Grimes (12–1) || Donohue || — || — || 39–24
|- bgcolor="ffbbbb"
| 65 || June 29 || Reds || 2–3 || Kolp || Swetonic (5–6) || — || — || 39–25
|- bgcolor="ccffcc"
| 66 || June 30 || @ Reds || 7–6 || Kremer (7–4) || Luque || Meine (1) || — || 40–25
|-

|- bgcolor="ccffcc"
| 67 || July 2 || Cardinals || 5–3 || Brame (6–3) || Mitchell || — || — || 41–25
|- bgcolor="ccffcc"
| 68 || July 3 || Cardinals || 13–2 || Grimes (13–1) || Sherdel || — || — || 42–25
|- bgcolor="ccffcc"
| 69 || July 4 || Cardinals || 8–4 || Meine (4–0) || Johnson || — || 20,000 || 43–25
|- bgcolor="ccffcc"
| 70 || July 4 || Cardinals || 8–2 || Kremer (8–4) || Haid || — || 43,000 || 44–25
|- bgcolor="ffbbbb"
| 71 || July 6 || Reds || 3–5 || Kolp || Swetonic (5–7) || May || — || 44–26
|- bgcolor="ccffcc"
| 72 || July 7 || @ Robins || 17–6 || Brame (7–3) || Dudley || Fussell (1) || 19,000 || 45–26
|- bgcolor="ccffcc"
| 73 || July 8 || @ Robins || 8–4 || Grimes (14–1) || Morrison || — || — || 46–26
|- bgcolor="ccffcc"
| 74 || July 9 || @ Robins || 3–1 || Kremer (9–4) || Dudley || — || — || 47–26
|- bgcolor="ccffcc"
| 75 || July 10 || @ Phillies || 15–9 || Fussell (2–0) || Benge || Hill (2) || — || 48–26
|- bgcolor="ccffcc"
| 76 || July 11 || @ Phillies || 6–2 || Brame (8–3) || Roy || — || — || 49–26
|- bgcolor="ccffcc"
| 77 || July 12 || @ Phillies || 6–4 || Grimes (15–1) || Sweetland || — || — || 50–26
|- bgcolor="ccffcc"
| 78 || July 13 || @ Phillies || 10–2 || Kremer (10–4) || Dailey || — || — || 51–26
|- bgcolor="ccffcc"
| 79 || July 15 || @ Braves || 5–4 (11) || Meine (5–0) || Brandt || — || — || 52–26
|- bgcolor="ffbbbb"
| 80 || July 16 || @ Braves || 1–4 || Smith || Brame (8–4) || — || — || 52–27
|- bgcolor="ffbbbb"
| 81 || July 17 || @ Braves || 4–7 || Seibold || Grimes (15–2) || — || — || 52–28
|- bgcolor="ccffcc"
| 82 || July 17 || @ Braves || 13–5 || Kremer (11–4) || Leverett || — || — || 53–28
|- bgcolor="ffbbbb"
| 83 || July 18 || @ Giants || 1–4 || Hubbell || Brame (8–5) || — || — || 53–29
|- bgcolor="ccffcc"
| 84 || July 20 || @ Giants || 5–2 || Grimes (16–2) || Walker || Swetonic (2) || — || 54–29
|- bgcolor="ffbbbb"
| 85 || July 20 || @ Giants || 4–8 || Mays || Meine (5–1) || — || — || 54–30
|- bgcolor="ccffcc"
| 86 || July 21 || @ Giants || 5–3 || Kremer (12–4) || Benton || — || — || 55–30
|- bgcolor="ccffcc"
| 87 || July 22 || Robins || 13–3 || Brame (9–5) || Moore || — || 10,000 || 56–30
|- bgcolor="ffbbbb"
| 88 || July 23 || Robins || 7–10 || Morrison || Fussell (2–1) || — || — || 56–31
|- bgcolor="ffbbbb"
| 89 || July 24 || Robins || 4–6 || Clark || Meine (5–2) || — || — || 56–32
|- bgcolor="ccffcc"
| 90 || July 26 || Braves || 9–8 || Petty (3–6) || Smith || — || — || 57–32
|- bgcolor="ffbbbb"
| 91 || July 27 || Braves || 3–10 || Seibold || French (3–3) || — || — || 57–33
|- bgcolor="ccffcc"
| 92 || July 27 || Braves || 5–2 || Brame (10–5) || Smith || — || — || 58–33
|- bgcolor="ffbbbb"
| 93 || July 29 || Braves || 9–10 || Jones || Meine (5–3) || Cantwell || 2,500 || 58–34
|- bgcolor="ffbbbb"
| 94 || July 30 || Phillies || 5–13 || Willoughby || Kremer (12–5) || — || — || 58–35
|- bgcolor="ffbbbb"
| 95 || July 31 || Phillies || 2–6 || Koupal || Brame (10–6) || — || 3,000 || 58–36
|-

|- bgcolor="ccffcc"
| 96 || August 1 || Phillies || 3–1 || Petty (4–6) || Elliott || — || 3,000 || 59–36
|- bgcolor="ffbbbb"
| 97 || August 2 || Phillies || 0–2 || Sweetland || French (3–4) || — || — || 59–37
|- bgcolor="ffbbbb"
| 98 || August 5 || Giants || 10–11 || Hubbell || Brame (10–7) || Benton || — || 59–38
|- bgcolor="ffbbbb"
| 99 || August 6 || Giants || 3–5 || Walker || Petty (4–7) || — || — || 59–39
|- bgcolor="ccffcc"
| 100 || August 7 || Giants || 4–3 || Kremer (13–5) || Henry || — || — || 60–39
|- bgcolor="ccffcc"
| 101 || August 8 || Cardinals || 5–1 || Brame (11–7) || Alexander || — || — || 61–39
|- bgcolor="ccffcc"
| 102 || August 9 || Cardinals || 7–6 || Swetonic (6–7) || Johnson || — || 5,000 || 62–39
|- bgcolor="ccffcc"
| 103 || August 10 || @ Robins || 6–4 || Petty (5–7) || Clark || Hill (3) || — || 63–39
|- bgcolor="ffbbbb"
| 104 || August 10 || @ Robins || 3–6 || Vance || Meine (5–4) || — || 20,000 || 63–40
|- bgcolor="ffbbbb"
| 105 || August 11 || @ Robins || 3–5 || Moss || Kremer (13–6) || Morrison || 9,000 || 63–41
|- bgcolor="ffbbbb"
| 106 || August 12 || @ Robins || 2–4 (10) || Morrison || Hill (2–3) || — || — || 63–42
|- bgcolor="ccffcc"
| 107 || August 14 || @ Braves || 1–0 || Petty (6–7) || Jones || — || — || 64–42
|- bgcolor="ffbbbb"
| 108 || August 15 || @ Braves || 1–2 || Brandt || Kremer (13–7) || — || — || 64–43
|- bgcolor="ccffcc"
| 109 || August 16 || @ Braves || 9–3 || Brame (12–7) || Seibold || — || — || 65–43
|- bgcolor="ccffcc"
| 110 || August 17 || @ Braves || 3–2 || French (4–4) || Smith || Swetonic (3) || — || 66–43
|- bgcolor="ffbbbb"
| 111 || August 19 || @ Phillies || 6–7 || Smythe || Swetonic (6–8) || — || — || 66–44
|- bgcolor="ffbbbb"
| 112 || August 19 || @ Phillies || 5–8 || McGraw || Kremer (13–8) || Smythe || — || 66–45
|- bgcolor="ffbbbb"
| 113 || August 20 || @ Phillies || 6–8 || Koupal || Brame (12–8) || Willoughby || — || 66–46
|- bgcolor="ffbbbb"
| 114 || August 21 || @ Phillies || 8–10 || Collins || Swetonic (6–9) || Smythe || — || 66–47
|- bgcolor="ccffcc"
| 115 || August 22 || @ Giants || 6–2 || Petty (7–7) || Henry || — || — || 67–47
|- bgcolor="ffbbbb"
| 116 || August 24 || @ Giants || 8–14 || Fitzsimmons || Fussell (2–2) || — || — || 67–48
|- bgcolor="ffbbbb"
| 117 || August 24 || @ Giants || 6–7 || Hubbell || Grimes (16–3) || — || — || 67–49
|- bgcolor="ffbbbb"
| 118 || August 25 || @ Giants || 5–10 || Benton || Petty (7–8) || — || 20,000 || 67–50
|- bgcolor="ffbbbb"
| 119 || August 27 || @ Phillies || 4–7 || Smythe || Brame (12–9) || — || — || 67–51
|- bgcolor="ccffcc"
| 120 || August 28 || Cubs || 10–3 || Grimes (17–3) || Malone || — || — || 68–51
|- bgcolor="ccffcc"
| 121 || August 28 || Cubs || 7–6 || Kremer (14–8) || Cvengros || Swetonic (4) || 20,000 || 69–51
|- bgcolor="ccffcc"
| 122 || August 29 || Cubs || 5–4 || Petty (8–8) || Carlson || — || — || 70–51
|- bgcolor="ccffcc"
| 123 || August 30 || Cubs || 15–0 || Meine (6–4) || Bush || — || — || 71–51
|- bgcolor="ffbbbb"
| 124 || August 31 || Cubs || 6–7 || Malone || Grimes (17–4) || Bush || — || 71–52
|-

|- bgcolor="ccffcc"
| 125 || September 1 || @ Reds || 9–7 (12) || Kremer (15–8) || Lucas || — || — || 72–52
|- bgcolor="ffbbbb"
| 126 || September 2 || Reds || 5–7 || May || Petty (8–9) || — || 8,500 || 72–53
|- bgcolor="ccffcc"
| 127 || September 2 || Reds || 9–8 (13) || Swetonic (7–9) || Kolp || — || 12,000 || 73–53
|- bgcolor="ffbbbb"
| 128 || September 4 || @ Reds || 4–5 || Kolp || Meine (6–5) || — || 1,148 || 73–54
|- bgcolor="ccffcc"
| 129 || September 5 || @ Reds || 10–5 || Brame (13–9) || Lucas || — || — || 74–54
|- bgcolor="ffbbbb"
| 130 || September 6 || Robins || 5–6 || Clark || Grimes (17–5) || Morrison || — || 74–55
|- bgcolor="ccffcc"
| 131 || September 6 || Robins || 8–1 || Petty (9–9) || Moss || — || 4,000 || 75–55
|- bgcolor="ccffcc"
| 132 || September 7 || Robins || 6–2 || Kremer (16–8) || Dudley || — || — || 76–55
|- bgcolor="ffbbbb"
| 133 || September 8 || @ Robins || 1–2 || Vance || French (4–5) || — || 10,000 || 76–56
|- bgcolor="ccffcc"
| 134 || September 9 || Robins || 9–7 || Brame (14–9) || Moore || — || — || 77–56
|- bgcolor="ccffcc"
| 135 || September 10 || Robins || 7–6 || French (5–5) || Morrison || — || — || 78–56
|- bgcolor="ffbbbb"
| 136 || September 11 || Giants || 1–2 || Walker || Grimes (17–6) || — || — || 78–57
|- bgcolor="ffbbbb"
| 137 || September 11 || Giants || 5–10 || Mays || Swetonic (7–10) || — || — || 78–58
|- bgcolor="ffbbbb"
| 138 || September 12 || Giants || 5–8 || Fitzsimmons || Kremer (16–9) || — || — || 78–59
|- bgcolor="ccffcc"
| 139 || September 16 || Phillies || 3–2 (10) || Petty (10–9) || Sweetland || — || — || 79–59
|- bgcolor="ccffcc"
| 140 || September 16 || Phillies || 5–2 || Brame (15–9) || Smythe || — || — || 80–59
|- bgcolor="ccffcc"
| 141 || September 17 || Phillies || 11–7 || French (6–5) || Smythe || Swetonic (5) || — || 81–59
|- bgcolor="ffbbbb"
| 142 || September 18 || Braves || 4–5 || Brandt || Kremer (16–10) || — || — || 81–60
|- bgcolor="ccffcc"
| 143 || September 18 || Braves || 5–2 || Meine (7–5) || Jones || — || — || 82–60
|- bgcolor="ffbbbb"
| 144 || September 19 || Braves || 3–6 || Seibold || Grimes (17–7) || Cooney || — || 82–61
|- bgcolor="ccffcc"
| 145 || September 20 || Braves || 10–3 || Petty (11–9) || Peery || — || — || 83–61
|- bgcolor="ccffcc"
| 146 || September 21 || Braves || 4–0 || Brame (16–9) || Smith || — || — || 84–61
|- bgcolor="ffbbbb"
| 147 || September 26 || @ Cardinals || 1–2 || Haid || Petty (11–10) || — || — || 84–62
|- bgcolor="ffbbbb"
| 148 || September 27 || @ Cardinals || 2–4 || Frankhouse || Brame (16–10) || Johnson || — || 84–63
|- bgcolor="ccffcc"
| 149 || September 28 || @ Cardinals || 8–5 || Swetonic (8–10) || Sherdel || — || — || 85–63
|- bgcolor="ccffcc"
| 150 || September 29 || @ Cardinals || 5–1 || Kremer (17–10) || Grabowski || — || — || 86–63
|- bgcolor="ffbbbb"
| 151 || September 29 || @ Cardinals || 2–10 || Hallahan || Meine (7–6) || — || — || 86–64
|-

|- bgcolor="ffbbbb"
| 152 || October 5 || Cardinals || 1–3 || Hallahan || Brame (16–11) || — || — || 86–65
|- bgcolor="ccffcc"
| 153 || October 5 || Cardinals || 8–7 || Kremer (18–10) || Johnson || — || — || 87–65
|- bgcolor="ccffcc"
| 154 || October 6 || @ Cubs || 8–3 || French (7–5) || Grampp || — || 30,000 || 88–65
|-

|-
| Legend:       = Win       = Loss       = TieBold = Pirates team member

Opening Day lineup

Roster

Player stats

Batting

Starters by position 
Note: Pos = Position; G = Games played; AB = At bats; H = Hits; Avg. = Batting average; HR = Home runs; RBI = Runs batted in

Other batters 
Note: G = Games played; AB = At bats; H = Hits; Avg. = Batting average; HR = Home runs; RBI = Runs batted in

Pitching

Starting pitchers 
Note: G = Games pitched; IP = Innings pitched; W = Wins; L = Losses; ERA = Earned run average; SO = Strikeouts

Other pitchers 
Note: G = Games pitched; IP = Innings pitched; W = Wins; L = Losses; ERA = Earned run average; SO = Strikeouts

Relief pitchers 
Note: G = Games pitched; W = Wins; L = Losses; SV = Saves; ERA = Earned run average; SO = Strikeouts

References 

 1929 Pittsburgh Pirates team page at Baseball Reference
 1929 Pittsburgh Pirates Page at Baseball Almanac

Pittsburgh Pirates seasons
Pittsburgh Pirates season
Pittsburg Pir